The Porter from Maxim's (French: Le chasseur de chez Maxim's) is a 1976 French comedy film directed by Claude Vital and starring Michel Galabru, Jean Lefebvre and Marie-Hélène Breillat. It is based on the 1923 play of the same name which has been made into several film adaptations.

Cast

References

Bibliography
 Rearick, Charles. Paris Dreams, Paris Memories: The City and Its Mystique. Stanford University Press, 2011.

External links 
 

1976 films
French comedy films
1970s French-language films
1976 comedy films
Films directed by Claude Vital
Films set in Paris
French films based on plays
Remakes of French films
1970s French films